Rikelme Hernandes Amorim Rocha (born 16 July 2003), simply known as Rikelme, is a Brazilian footballer who plays as an attacking midfielder or a forward for Cuiabá.

Club career
Born in Cuiabá, Mato Grosso, Rikelme joined Cuiabá's youth setup in 2003, aged 14. After impressing with the under-15 squad, he signed a professional contract in 2019, and was subsequently loaned to Cruzeiro.

Upon returning in December 2020, Rikelme made his first team debut for Dourado on 6 February 2021, coming on as a late substitute for Elvis in a 1–0 home win over Vila Nova, for the 2020 Copa Verde. In 2021, he only appeared with the main squad in the Campeonato Mato-Grossense and in the Copa FMF, as the club opted to field an under-23 team in the latter tournament.

Rikelme was loaned to Dom Bosco for the 2022 Mato-Grossense, being unable to play in the semifinals against his parent club. Upon returning, he featured in two Copa Sudamericana matches before making his Série A debut on 23 October 2022, replacing André Luis in a 2–1 home loss against Goiás.

Personal life
Rikelme's older brother Matheus Ernandes is also a footballer. A central defender, he was also groomed at Cuiabá.

Career statistics

References

2003 births
Living people
People from Cuiabá
Sportspeople from Mato Grosso
Brazilian footballers
Association football midfielders
Association football forwards
Campeonato Brasileiro Série A players
Cuiabá Esporte Clube players